Akiak  is a city in Bethel Census Area, Alaska, United States. The population was 462 at the 2020 census, up from 346 in 2010. It is the home of the Akiak Native Community.

Geography and climate
Akiak is located in the Bethel Recording District.

History and culture
In 1880, the village, then known as Akkiagamute, had a population of 175. The current name Akiak means "the other side," since this place was a crossing to the Yukon River basin during the winter for area Yupiit. The community established a post office in 1916. The U.S. Public Health Service built a hospital in the 1920s. The city was incorporated in 1970. Akiak is a Yup'ik village with a reliance on subsistence and fishing activities.

Akiak Native Community
The Akiak Native Community is a federally recognized Alaska Native tribe located in Akiak.

Demographics

Akiak first appeared on the 1880 U.S. Census as the unincorporated Alaska Native (Inuit) village of "Akkiagamute." All 175 residents were Inuit. In 1890, it returned as "Akiagamiut" with 97 residents (all Alaska Native). It did not appear on the census again until 1920, then as Akiak. It has returned in every successive census. It formally incorporated in 1970.

As of the census of 2000, there were 309 people, 69 households, and 54 families residing in the city. There were 76 housing units at an average density of 38.7 per square mile (14.9/km). The racial makeup of the city was 4.85% White, 92.88% Native American, and 2.27% from two or more races. 0.65% of the population were Hispanic or Latino of any race.

Of Akiak's 69 households, 53.6% had children under the age of 18 living with them, 43.5% were married couples living together, 20.3% had a female householder with no husband present, and 21.7% were non-families. 18.8% of all households were made up of individuals, and 4.3% had someone living alone who was 65 years of age or older. The average household size was 4.48 and the average family size was 5.24.

In the city, the age distribution of the population shows 43.4% under the age of 18, 11.3% from 18 to 24, 23.9% from 25 to 44, 14.6% from 45 to 64, and 6.8% who were 65 years of age or older. The median age was 21 years. For every 100 females, there were 122.3 males. For every 100 females age 18 and over, there were 105.9 males.

The median income for a household in the city was $26,250, and the median income for a family was $36,875. Males had a median income of $21,875 versus $11,667 for females. The per capita income for the city was $8,326. About 25.0% of families and 33.9% of the population were below the poverty line, including 40.3% of those under the age of eighteen and 6.7% of those 65 or over.

Public services

A new well-water treatment plant and storage tank were recently completed. The school and clinic are connected directly to the water plant. Individual wells, septic systems and plumbing were installed in 14 HUD homes during 1997. Sewage disposal is currently by septic tanks, honey buckets or privies, but major improvements are underway. A piped water and gravity sewer system is under construction, with household plumbing. 67 homes need water and sewer service. Most residents are dependent upon the washeteria for laundry and bathing. The city provides septic pumping services. Electricity is provided by the city of Akiak. There is one school located in the community, attended by 99 students.

The city is currently home to the world's third largest museum of taxidermy. Local hospitals or health clinics include Edith Kawagley Memorial Clinic (907-765-7125). Edith Kawagley Memorial Clinic is a Primary Health Care facility. Akiak is classified as an isolated village; it is found in EMS Region 7A in the Yukon/Kuskokwim Region. Emergency services have river and air access and are provided by a health aide.

Economy and transportation

The majority of the year-round employment in Akiak is with the city, schools or other public services. Commercial fishing or BLM fire-fighting also provide seasonal income. Twenty-seven residents hold commercial fishing permits. The community is interested in developing a fish processing plant and tourism. Subsistence activities are important to residents. Poor fish returns since 1997 have significantly affected the community.

The strip provides chartered or private air access year-round. Arctic Circle Air Service, Grant Aviation, and Hageland Aviation offer passenger flight service. Snow machines, ATVs, and skiffs are used extensively for local transportation to nearby villages. There are no docking facilities.

The town has no sales tax, property tax, or special taxes.  The sale or importation of alcohol is banned in the village.

Notable people 
 Nora Guinn (1920–2005), judge

References

External links

 Akiak  at the Community Database Online from the Alaska Division of Community and Regional Affairs
 Maps from the Alaska Department of Labor and Workforce Development: 2000, 2010

Cities in Bethel Census Area, Alaska
Cities in Alaska
Road-inaccessible communities of Alaska
Cities in Unorganized Borough, Alaska